Herongate and Ingrave is a civil parish in the Brentwood borough in Essex, England.
The parish includes the villages of Ingrave and Herongate. The parish was formed on 1 April 2003 from part of the unparished area of Brentwood.

References

Civil parishes in Essex
Borough of Brentwood